Kim Haneul (March 22, 1988 – October 8, 2013), better known by her stage name Rottyful Sky, formerly known as Haneul, was a Korean pop singer and producer.

Career

Solo career and further singles (2001–2006)
She debuted in 2001 with the album Voice of Purity under the stage name "Sky." She was 14 years old at the time under East Asian age reckoning.

In 2006 she announced she would join the Hip-Hop Dance group Roo'ra, although she withdrew in 2007 before releasing any new material. The announcement was made at the same time as Roo'ra's announcement of their comeback with a 'best of' album, hence she is credited on the album although she didn't participate on it.

In 2009 she joined the group MADmoiselle, which released one digital single before disbanding.

Stage name change, No Way and Get Away (2010—2013)
Nine years after her debut, in 2010, she made her comeback as a solo artist, under the stage name Rottyful Sky, with the release of the digital single "No Way". At that time, she became the first singer to be produced by actor-singer Ryu Si-won. On June 24, 2010, Sony MUSIC launch the first Korean video of "No way" in 3D. On February 12, 2013, she released a second digital single "Get Away".

Death
On October 8, 2013, she died at the age of 25 after struggling with a brain tumor.

Discography

Albums
 [2001.08.16] Voice of Purity (Hanul)

Digital Singles
 [2010.07.22] No Way
 [2011.03.04] Midas OST Part.4 (마이더스)
 [2013.02.12] Get Away

Collaboration/Others
[2007.09.05] House Rulez – Mojito (#3 Mojito (feat. Hanul))
[2008.06.20] My-Q – This Is for You (#4 Yeoreum Haneul (feat. Hanul))
[2008.09.24] Listen Campaign (#4 Save My Heart)
[2008.11.18] Ignite – Ignite Spot (1st Single Album) (#2 Good Memories (feat. Hanul))
[2009.06.16] Ignite – Look So Good (#10 Good Memories (feat. Hanul) (Full Version))
[2009.08.28] Style OST (#1 Tell Me (JP, Hanul), No. 5 Eojjeoda Neoreul, No. 17 Tell Me (Hanul Version))
[2011.07.14] BIG BANG (singer)|BIG BANG – BIG BANG 2+1 (#1 2+1 (feat. Hanul))
[2011.07.29] Scent of a Woman OST Part.1 – (#2 Bluebird)

Filmography

Dramas
 [2011] Manny (EP5)

References

K-pop singers
1988 births
2013 deaths
South Korean women pop singers